Dwight Richard Browning (born November 14, 1952) is a former member of the West Virginia Senate from Wyoming County, West Virginia, USA. A Democrat, he served from 2008 to 2012 for the 9th district. Before his election to the senate, Browning was a member of the West Virginia House of Delegates from 1988 to 1996 and from 2000 to 2008.

External links
West Virginia Legislature - Senator Richard Browning official government website
Senator Dwight Richard 'Richard' Browning (WV)

1952 births
Living people
Marshall University alumni
West Virginia University alumni
West Virginia state senators
21st-century American politicians